The Way We Were: Live in Concert is a live album by vocalist Etta Jones and saxophonist Houston Person which was recorded in Cleveland in 2000 but not released on the Highnote label until 2011.

Reception

In his review on Allmusic, Steve Leggett notes that "Etta Jones could flat-out sing, and she never failed to make the blues, jazz, and Great American Songbook standards she sang her own, especially in her many collaborations with tenor saxophonist Houston Person, who was as sympathetic a player as any singer could ever hope for – Jones and Person simply clicked and understood each other as a duo ... This set is both a pleasant listen and a fun archival recording – it captures Jones and Person at their best in front of a nimble and flexible rhythm section"

Track listing 
 "Do Nothin' Till You Hear from Me" (Duke Ellington, Bob Russell) – 6:49	
 "The Way We Were" (Marvin Hamlisch, Alan Bergman, Marilyn Bergman) – 7:15
 "'Deed I Do" (Fred Rose, Walter Hirsch) – 5:17	
 "Please Send Me Someone to Love" (Percy Mayfield) – 5:48
 "Fine and Mellow" (Billie Holiday) – 6:28
 "Oh, Lady Be Good!" (George Gershwin, Ira Gershwin) – 4:11
 "Somewhere in My Lifetime"  (Jesus Alvarez) – 5:32
 "I Could Have Danced All Night" (Frederick Loewe, Alan Jay Lerner) – 3:57	
 "What a Wonderful World" (George Douglas, George David Weiss) – 5:05	
 "Ma! He's Making Eyes at Me" (Con Conrad, Sidney Clare) – 2:07
 "Don't Go to Strangers" (Arthur Kent, Dave Mann, Redd Evans) – 3:50	
 "I'll Be Seeing You" (Sammy Fain, Irving Kahal) – 2:37

Personnel 
Etta Jones – vocals
Houston Person – tenor saxophone
Stan Hope – piano
George Kaye – bass
Chip White – drums

References 

Etta Jones live albums
Houston Person live albums
2011 live albums
HighNote Records live albums
Live vocal jazz albums